The Red Hill Douglas County, Oregon AVA is an American Viticultural Area located in Douglas County, Oregon, near the town of Yoncalla. It is entirely contained within the Umpqua Valley AVA, which is itself included within the larger Southern Oregon AVA.

History
Originally petitioned in 2002 as the "Red Hill AVA", the proposed appellation name brought protest from Willamette Valley AVA vintners, where a region known as Red Hill is also located. Another AVA in California that gained official status in 2004, the Red Hills Lake County AVA also carries a similar name. As a result, the name "Red Hill Douglas County, Oregon" was instead chosen to avoid consumer confusion and the AVA designation was granted in 2005.

Red Hill Vineyard
The AVA is the home to a single vineyard, the Red Hill Vineyard, founded by the late Wayne Hitchings in 1991.  Hitchings died on September 5, 2016. Fruit from Red Hill Vineyard continues to be sold to a few winemakers throughout Oregon.

Notable wines
The 2011 Art Brut Outsider Cuvée, a sparkling wine by Roots Wine Company that contains Red Hill pinot noir and chardonnay, was a featured selection by Oregon wine club Cellar 503 in February 2016.

References

American Viticultural Areas
Oregon wine
Geography of Douglas County, Oregon
2005 establishments in Oregon